Shrihari Sathe is an Indian filmmaker and producer. Sathe is a 2013 Sundance Institute Creative Producing Fellow. His feature directorial debut, Ek Hazarachi Note (1000 Rupee Note), won the Special Jury Award and Centenary Award for Best Film at the 2014 International Film Festival of India and has received over 35 awards. He was a member of the jury at the 2017 Miami International Film Festival. Shrihari Sathe received the Producers Award 2019 as part of 34th Independent Spirit Awards.

Sathe is the recipient of the 2016 Cinereach Producer Award. He is a Trans Atlantic Partners fellow – 2013 and Cannes Producer's Network fellow – 2014, 2015, 2016. His selected short film credits include Breaking the Chain, Golden Palm Award winner at Mexico International Film Festival (2010), First Day of Peace, Grand Jury Prize winner at Slamdance Film Festival (2010) and Off Season, a BAFTA (2010) nominee. Sathe is a member of the Producers Guild of America, Indian Motion Picture Producers Association and Film Writers Association (India).

Biography 
Shrihari Sathe was born in 1983 in Bombay, Maharashtra, India. He did his schooling at St. Xavier's College, Mumbai and then moved to US at the age of 17. Sathe majored in Film and Video Studies and Global Media and Culture from University of Michigan, Ann Arbor. He also has an MFA-Film Degree from Columbia University’s School of the Arts in New York. In 2007, he took a short sabbatical to assist Rakeysh Omprakash Mehra on his film Delhi-6. He spent almost a year working on that film and then returned to NYC to finish the degree.

His production house, Infinitum Productions, works out of Mumbai and New York. His father, Chandrashekhar Shrikrishna Sathe, worked in the banking industry for over 30 years, retired in 2009 and he decided to join work with Shrihari. They now closely develop projects. And his father finances his productions.

Shrihari Sathe is an Adjunct Assistant Professor at Columbia University’s School of the Arts and frequently does master classes at various universities since 2015.

Awards 

 34th Independent Spirit Awards: Producers Award 2019
Cinereach Producer Award 2016 (Beach Rats, Dukhtar, It Felt Like Love)
Ischia Film Festival: Best film 2015: Ek Hazarachi Note
The 45th International Film Festival of India 2014
Silver Peacock (Best Film) for "Ek Hazarachi Note"
Centenary Award for "Ek Hazarachi Note"
 Columbia University Film Festival: Best producer 2009: Breaking the Chain

Nominations 

Independent Spirit John Cassavetes Award: It Felt Like Love (Producer in the creative team) 2015
Gotham Awards: Audience Award 2014 It Felt Like Love
BAFTA Award for Best Short Film 2010: Off Season

Filmography 

 Director
1000 Rupee Note (Ek Hazarachi) Note) 2014
 Producer
Stay Awake 2022
Slow Machine 2020
Screwdriver (Mafak) 2018
The Sweet Requiem 2018
Beach Rats 2017 (Co-Producer) 
A Woman, A Part 2016
It Felt Like Love 2013
Off Season 2009
Breaking the Chain 2009

References

External links 

Indian film directors
Year of birth missing (living people)
Living people
Indian film producers
University of Michigan alumni
Columbia University School of the Arts alumni
Columbia University faculty